Sean Douglas may refer to:

Sean Douglas (footballer), a retired New Zealand international association football player.
Sean Douglas (songwriter), American songwriter, producer, musician
Sean Douglas, actor in Mr. Deity
Sean Douglas, general authority of The Church of Jesus Christ of Latter-day Saints

See also
Sean Douglass (born 1979), American baseball player, right-handed pitcher